Allister Wences MacNeil (born September 27, 1935) is a Canadian former National Hockey League player and coach. He was the first native of Atlantic Canada to serve as a head coach in the NHL.

Career
He played parts of eleven seasons in the National Hockey League as a rugged defenceman with the Toronto Maple Leafs, Montreal Canadiens, Chicago Black Hawks, New York Rangers and Pittsburgh Penguins.

Upon retiring as a player, MacNeil turned to coaching with the Montreal Voyageurs of the American Hockey League, top farm club of the Canadiens, for the 1969–70 season. After a successful debut, MacNeil became an assistant coach to Claude Ruel of the NHL Canadiens for the 1970–71 season.

Montreal Canadiens
During that season, the Habs struggled for a good portion of the season, at one point in danger of missing the playoffs for a second straight year—something that hadn't happened since they missed the playoffs three years in a row from 1919 to 1922. Ruel resigned 23 games into the season and MacNeil took the helm; meanwhile, the club swung a major trade to net top scoring left wing Frank Mahovlich from the Detroit Red Wings. The Canadiens rallied to qualify for the playoffs as third seed in their division, then MacNeil led the team to an unexpected Stanley Cup championship. The Habs stunned the heavily favoured Boston Bruins in the opening round of the playoffs, and then defeated the Minnesota North Stars and Chicago Black Hawks, winning the latter series after having been behind 3–2.

Crucial to the Stanley Cup victory was MacNeil's decision to use rookie goaltender Ken Dryden in the playoffs despite Dryden having played only six regular-season games in 1970–71. MacNeil was presumably impressed that Dryden won all these games, allowing only nine goals (1.65 GAA). Another crucial choice was having rookie Rejean Houle mark the Black Hawks' goalscorer Bobby Hull. Houle was nicknamed the "shadow of Bobby Hull" as Hull managed to score only one even-strength goal in the series.

Unfortunately, MacNeil had a frosty relationship with most of the team's francophone players, most notably Henri Richard.  He was the first Canadiens coach in recent memory who couldn't speak French at all.  When MacNeil benched Richard during the final series against the Black Hawks, Richard publicly criticised the coach, calling him incompetent. In game seven held at Chicago, being tied at 2–2 after the first two periods, the Canadiens scored the winning goal early in the third to take the series and the championship, with Richard scoring both the equalizer and game winner. MacNeil and Richard hugged at the end of the game, but that did little to patch up their differences.  Winning the Cup, however, was not enough to save MacNeil's job; he was demoted to head coach of the Canadiens' American Hockey League affiliate, the Nova Scotia Voyageurs, while the fluently bilingual Scotty Bowman succeeded him as head coach of the Habs. MacNeil won three Calder Cup Championships (1972, 1976, 1977) in six years with the Voyageurs.

On October 10, 2013, it was announced MacNeil had been named to the AHL's 2014 Hall of Fame class, alongside Bob Perreault, John Slaney and Bill Dineen.

He later returned to the Canadiens winning two more Stanley Cups as Director of Player Personnel in 1978 and 1979.

Atlanta/Calgary Flames
On June 7, 1979, MacNeil resigned from his position with the Canadiens to succeed Fred Creighton as the third-ever head coach of the Atlanta Flames. He remained in that capacity through the franchise's move to Calgary and up until his promotion to director of player development and professional scouting on May 31, 1982. MacNeil won his fourth Stanley Cup in 1989 as Calgary's assistant general manager.

On December 10, 2001, MacNeil returned to head coaching duties after almost two decades when the Flames head coach at the time, Greg Gilbert, was suspended for a period of two games for his role in a brawl in a game with the Mighty Ducks of Anaheim. When Gilbert was fired in the next season due to the Flames' poor performance, MacNeil once again assumed interim head coaching duties before Darryl Sutter was hired.

MacNeil has been involved in professional hockey for more than 50 years as a player, coach, assistant manager and director of hockey operations.

Al MacNeil is married, he has two children, daughter Allison and son Allister, and two grandsons from his daughter.

Career statistics

Regular season and playoffs

Coaching record

References

External links 
 

1935 births
Living people
Atlanta Flames coaches
Calgary Flames coaches
Calgary Flames executives
Calgary Flames scouts
Canadian ice hockey centres
Canadian ice hockey coaches
Canadian people of Scottish descent
Chicago Blackhawks players
Hull-Ottawa Canadiens players
Ice hockey people from Nova Scotia
Montreal Canadiens coaches
Montreal Canadiens players
New York Rangers players
People from Sydney, Nova Scotia
Pittsburgh Penguins players
Sportspeople from the Cape Breton Regional Municipality
Stanley Cup champions
Stanley Cup championship-winning head coaches
Toronto Maple Leafs players
Toronto Marlboros players